J. Bernardt is a side project of Belgian musician Jinte Deprez, which he launched in 2016 when his band Balthazar took a break. His debut album Running Days was released in 2017, and includes contributions from Adriaan Van De Velde on synths and drummer Klaas De Somer (Tourist LeMC). The album is a blend of different styles, including R&B, soul, hip hop, and electronica.

Biography
Deprez has been musically active since his late teens. In 2004, he co-founded the pop/rock group Balthazar together with Maarten Devoldere and Patricia Vanneste. Deprez is one of the band's vocalists and guitarists, and he has produced several of their albums. To date, Balthazar has released five studio albums, one EP, and several singles.

Discography
For Balthazar discography, see Balthazar

Studio albums
 Running Days (2017)

EPs
 Running Days (Remixes) (2017)

Singles
 "Calm Down" (2016)
 "Wicked Streets" (2017)
 "On Fire" (2017)
 "The Question" (2017)
 "The Other Man" (2017)

References

External links
 

1987 births
Belgian composers
Male composers
Belgian male musicians
Belgian musicians
Living people